George Holmes may refer to:

 George Holmes (archivist) (1662–1749), English deputy Keeper of Records in the Tower of London 
 George Holmes (bishop) (1858–1912), 3rd Bishop of Athabasca
 George Holmes (footballer) (1892–?), English soccer player
 George Holmes (historian) (1927–2009), professor of medieval history at the University of Oxford
 George Holmes (musician) (c.1680–1720), English organist
 George Holmes (vice-chancellor), Vice-Chancellor of the University of Bolton
 George Frederick Holmes (1820–1897), American academic
 Geoffrey Holmes (1894–1964), British ice hockey player sometimes listed as George Holmes
 George H. Holmes (1898–1965), last enlisted pilot in the USAF
 George Holmes (civil servant) (born 1926), British forester and public official
 George M. Holmes (1929–2009), Republican member of the North Carolina General Assembly
 George Bax Holmes (1803–1887), English Quaker and fossil collector
 George Holmes (actor) (1918-1985), American film and television actor